Bathealton is a village and civil parish in Somerset, England, situated  west of Wellington and  west of Taunton in the Somerset West and Taunton district.  The village has a population of 194.

History

It was recorded in the Domesday Book as Badeheltone. The parish of Bathealton was part of the Milverton Hundred,

Bathealton Court is a country house, dating from around 1766, but probably incorporating earlier dwelling. It was remodelled around 1850.

The routes of the Grand Western Canal and the Bristol and Exeter Railway pass within a short distance of the village.

The Village Hall, was previously the Village School until its last intake of pupils in the early 1950s.

Governance

The parish council has responsibility for local issues, including setting an annual precept (local rate) to cover the council's operating costs and producing annual accounts for public scrutiny. The parish council evaluates local planning applications and works with the local police, district council officers, and neighbourhood watch groups on matters of crime, security, and traffic. The parish council's role also includes initiating projects for the maintenance and repair of parish facilities, as well as consulting with the district council on the maintenance, repair, and improvement of highways, drainage, footpaths, public transport, and street cleaning. Conservation matters (including trees and listed buildings) and environmental issues are also the responsibility of the council.

The village falls within the non-metropolitan district of Somerset West and Taunton, which was established on 1 April 2019. It was previously in the district of Taunton Deane, which was formed on 1 April 1974 under the Local Government Act 1972, and part of Wellington Rural District before that. The district council is responsible for local planning and building control, local roads, council housing, environmental health, markets and fairs, refuse collection and recycling, cemeteries and crematoria, leisure services, parks, and tourism.

Somerset County Council is responsible for running the largest and most expensive local services such as education, social services, libraries, main roads, public transport, policing and fire services, trading standards, waste disposal and strategic planning.

It is also part of the Taunton Deane county constituency represented in the House of Commons of the Parliament of the United Kingdom. It elects one Member of Parliament (MP) by the first past the post system of election, and was part of the South West England constituency of the European Parliament prior to Britain leaving the European Union in January 2020, which elected seven MEPs using the d'Hondt method of party-list proportional representation.

Religious sites
The Church of St Bartholomew dates from 1854 and has been designated as a Grade II listed building. Its chancel retains monuments to the Webers and Moseys, eminent families in the history of the village.

References

External links

Villages in Taunton Deane
Civil parishes in Somerset